Wang Zhiwen (born June 25, 1966) is a Chinese actor born in Shanghai, China.  He was selected by for his acting abilities at an early age and began to pursue a career in acting that has flourished in recent years, culminating in his role in Chen Kaige's Together. He also starred in the 2006 film A Battle of Wits as the King of Liang and the 2004 film Ai Zuozhan where he played Wah.

Selected filmography

References

External links

Wang Zhiwen at the Chinese Movie Database

 

1966 births
Living people
Male actors from Shanghai
Chinese male film actors
Chinese male television actors
20th-century Chinese male actors
21st-century Chinese male actors
Best Supporting Actor Asian Film Award winners